Roger Kirk is the name of:

 Roger Kirk (designer), Australian costume designer
 Roger Kirk (diplomat) (born 1930), diplomat and former United States Ambassador to Somalia and Romania
 Roger Kirk (presenter) (died 2001), British radio presenter
 Roger E. Kirk (born 1930), American psychologist

See also
 Roger Kirkby (disambiguation)
 Roger Kirkman